Michael Jacquet III (born January 29, 1997) is an American football cornerback for the Los Angeles Chargers of the National Football League (NFL). He was signed by the Philadelphia Eagles as an undrafted free agent in 2020 following his college football career with the Louisiana Ragin' Cajuns.

Professional career

Philadelphia Eagles
Jacquet signed with the Philadelphia Eagles as an undrafted free agent following the 2020 NFL Draft on April 26, 2020. He was waived during final roster cuts on September 4, 2020, and was signed to the practice squad on September 29. He was elevated to the active roster on October 31 and November 14 for the team's weeks 8 and 10 games against the Dallas Cowboys and New York Giants, and reverted to the practice squad after each game. He made his NFL debut in the Cowboys game. He was signed to the active roster on November 17, 2020.
In Week 15 against the Arizona Cardinals, Jacquet forced a fumble on wide receiver DeAndre Hopkins that was recovered by the Eagles and later recorded his first career sack on Kyler Murray during the 33–26 loss.

On August 31, 2021, Jacquet was waived by the Eagles and re-signed to the practice squad the next day. He was released from the practice squad on October 26.

Jacksonville Jaguars
On November 15, 2021, Jacquet was signed to the Jacksonville Jaguars practice squad.

New York Giants
On May 19, 2022, Jacquet signed with the New York Giants. On August 14, 2022, Jacquet was waived.

Los Angeles Chargers
On August 23, 2022, Jacquet signed with the Los Angeles Chargers. He was waived on August 30, 2022 He was released off the practice squad on October 6. He was re-signed to the practice squad on October 31. He signed a reserve/future contract on January 17, 2023.

References

External links
Philadelphia Eagles bio
Louisiana Ragin' Cajuns football bio

1997 births
Living people
Sportspeople from Beaumont, Texas
Players of American football from Texas
American football cornerbacks
Louisiana Ragin' Cajuns football players
Philadelphia Eagles players
Jacksonville Jaguars players
New York Giants players
Los Angeles Chargers players